A bear is a carnivoran mammal of the family Ursidae.

Bear or Bears may also refer to:

Places
 Bear (barony), County Cork, Ireland
 Bear, Arkansas, United States, an unincorporated place
 Bear, Delaware, United States, a census-designated place
 Bear, Idaho, United States, an unincorporated place
 Bear Brook (disambiguation)
 Bear Cave, Romania
 Bear Creek (disambiguation)
 Bear Island (disambiguation)
 Bear Mountain (disambiguation)
 Bear River (disambiguation)
 Bear Seamount, an underwater volcano in the Atlantic Ocean
 Bears, Friesland, Netherlands, a village

People
 Bear (surname), any of several people with this family name
 Bear (nickname), any of several people nicknamed "Bear" or "the Bear"
 Bear McCreary (born 1979), an American musician 
 Bear Pascoe (born 1986), former American football tight end
 Bear Rinehart (born 1980), American singer

Arts, entertainment, and media

Characters
 Bear,  the main character from the TV series Bear in the Big Blue House
 Bear, a character from the TV series WordWorld
Bear, a Railway Series character
 Bear, a character from .hack, a multimedia franchise
 The Bear (Bo' Selecta!), a comic character created by Leigh Francis
King Bear, recurring character in the Tara Duncan book series who is ruler of the magical kingdom/realm Lancovit on the planet Otherworld.

Films
 Bear (2010 film), a US natural horror film
 Bear (2011 film), a black comedy short film by Nash Edgerton
 Bears (film), a 2014 Disneynature film
 The Bear (1938 film), a Soviet drama film
 The Bear (1984 film), an American biopic about football coach Paul "Bear" Bryant
 The Bear (1988 film), a French adventure-drama
 The Bear (1998 film), a British animated television short
 The Bear (2012 film), an Iranian film (original release Khers)

Literature
 Bear (novel), by Marian Engel
 The Bear (fairy tale)
 The Bear (play), by Anton Chekhov
 "The Bear", a short story by William Faulkner from Go Down, Moses
 The Bear, a children's book by Raymond Briggs
 The Bear, a novel by Claire Cameron
 The Bear, a novel by Andrew Krivak

Music
 The Bears (band), an American power pop band formed in 1985
 The Bears (album), 1987
 Symphony No. 82 (Haydn), popularly known as the Bear Symphony
 The Bear (album), by Element Eighty

Radio stations
 CFBR-FM, "100.3 The Bear", Edmonton, Alberta, Canada
 CKNL-FM, "101.5 The Bear", Fort St. John, British Columbia, Canada
 CKQB-FM in Ottawa, Ontario, Canada (CKQB-FM identified as "106.9 The Bear" from 1994–2009 and 2011–2014)
 CKRX-FM, "102.3 The Bear", Fort Nelson, British Columbia, Canada
 KQBR, Texas, United States
 Touch FM (Stratford-upon-Avon) also known as The Bear 102, Stratford-upon-Avon, England
 WBRW, "105.3 the Bear", Blacksburg, Virginia, United States
 WBYR, "98.9 the Bear", Woodburn, Indiana, United States
 WEKS, "The Bear 92.5", Zebulon, Georgia, United States
 WNBB, "97.9 the Bear", Bayboro, North Carolina, United States
 WZGM, "96.1 the Bear", Black Mountain, North Carolina, United States

Other arts, entertainment, and media
Bear (comics), by Jamie Smart
"Bear", a 1984 TV ad known for its "bear in the woods" line, for presidential candidate Ronald Reagan
 "Bears", an episode of the television series Zoboomafoo
 The Bear (opera), by William Walton
 The Bear (TV series), a 2022 television series on FX on Hulu

Brands and enterprises
 Bear (St. Paul's Churchyard), a historical bookseller in London
 Bear Inn, Cowbridge, Wales
 The Bear, Oxford, England
 Microsoft Bear, a project mascot
 Nestlé Bear Brand, a powdered milk and sterilized milk brand

Sports teams

Collegiate
 Baylor Bears, United States
 Brown Bears, United States
 California Golden Bears, United States
 Central Arkansas Bears, United States
 Mercer Bears, United States
 Missouri State Bears, United States
 Morgan State Bears, United States
 Northern Colorado Bears, United States
 NYIT Bears, United States

Professional
 Brisbane Bears, an Australian rules football club
 Chicago Bears, an American football team
 Coventry Bears, an English rugby league football club
 Doosan Bears, a KBO League Baseball club
 Hershey Bears, an American hockey team
 North Sydney Bears, an Australian rugby league football club
 Oldham Bears, an English rugby league football club

Military
 BEAR (Beam Experiments Aboard a Rocket), a U.S. experimental particle-beam weapon
 Battlefield Extraction-Assist Robot, a humanoid military robot
 Tupolev Tu-95, a Russian bomber aircraft, NATO reporting name "Bear"
 , a United States Coast Guard cutter
 , a United States Navy ship and forerunner of modern icebreakers

Other uses
 Bear (Boy Scouts of America), an achievement level
 Bear (gay culture)
 Bear (grape)
 BEAR and LION ciphers
 Bear market, in economics, a general decline in a stock market
 Bere (grain), which can also be spelled "bear"
 Pedobear, an Internet meme
 Russian Bear, a symbol of Russia
 The Gentlemen Bears, drinking and dining society of St Edmund's College, Cambridge
 Water bear, another name for the microanimal tardigrade
 Bear, common name of the moth Lycia ursaria

See also

 Bär (disambiguation)
 Baer (disambiguation)
 Bare (disambiguation)
 Behr (disambiguation)
 Big Bear (disambiguation)
 Bruin (disambiguation)
 Little Bear (disambiguation)